Dynamite is a small unincorporated community in Spokane County, Washington, United States. The elevation of Dynamite is 2,333 feet. It is located about 13 miles south of Downtown Spokane in the Channeled Scablands. There is no real community in Dynamite, and the immediate surrounding area is largely forested or farmland with houses spaced well apart. The James T. Slavin Conservation Area is located a couple of miles to the north.

Two roads in the vicinity of Dynamite, Dynamite Lane and Blasted Lane, indicate the general location. U.S. Route 195 a highway and major north-south thoroughfare stretching from Spokane south through the Palouse to Lewiston, Idaho runs about two miles east of Dynamite's location.

References

Unincorporated communities in Washington (state)
Unincorporated communities in Spokane County, Washington